is a Japanese ferry company based in Hatsukaichi, Hiroshima, Japan.

Miyajima Matsudai Kisen operates the ferries between Miyajimaguchi, Hatsukaichi, Hiroshima and Miyajima (Itsukushima). Between Miyajima-guchi and Miyajima, it operates tourist ships and car ferries, taking ten minutes.

Miyajima Matsudai Kisen is a Hiroden Group company.

Piers
Miyajima-guchi
Miyajima

See also

Itsukushima
Itsukushima Shrine
Hiroshima Electric Railway - Hiroden-miyajima-guchi Station
JR Miyajima Ferry

External links
Miyajima Matsudai Kisen (in Japanese)

Companies based in Hiroshima Prefecture
Transport in Hiroshima Prefecture
Ferry companies of Japan
Ferries of Japan